Kate Barclay (born 4 October 1980) is an Australian sprint canoeist who competed in the mid-2000s. At the 2004 Summer Olympics, she finished sixth in the K-4 500 m event.

References
Sports-Reference.com profile

1980 births
Australian female canoeists
Canoeists at the 2004 Summer Olympics
Living people
Olympic canoeists of Australia